Ancona is an unincorporated community in Livingston County, Illinois, United States. Ancona is located along a railroad line south-southwest of Streator. Ancona has a post office with ZIP code 61311. It formerly served the Santa Fe Railway at Ancona Station.

It takes its name from the Italian city of Ancona, capital of the Marches.

References

Unincorporated communities in Livingston County, Illinois
Unincorporated communities in Illinois